Norman Arnold Holmes (21 September 1890 – July 1965) was an English professional footballer who played as a right-back in the Football League for Clapton Orient and Huddersfield Town.

Personal life 
Holmes was the younger brother of footballer and manager Billy Holmes. He served in the Middlesex Regiment during the First World War and rose to the rank of lance corporal in the 1st Football Battalion, before being commissioned into the 21st (Service) Battalion as a second lieutenant in June 1918. Holmes' football career was ended by wounds received during the course of his service.

Career statistics

References

Middlesex Regiment soldiers
Military personnel from Derbyshire
People from Matlock, Derbyshire
English footballers
Leyton Orient F.C. players
Huddersfield Town A.F.C. players
York City F.C. (1908) players
English Football League players
1890 births
People from Darley Dale
Footballers from Derbyshire
Association football fullbacks
British Army personnel of World War I
Middlesex Regiment officers
Leeds City F.C. players
Clapton Orient F.C. wartime guest players
1965 deaths